Tung Tau Estate is a public housing estate and Tenants Purchase Scheme estate in the south of Wong Tai Sin, located between San Po Kong and Kowloon City, in Hong Kong. It was first built in the 1960s as resettlement housing, but has since been reconstructed.

It was divided into Tung Tau (I) Estate and Tung Tau (II) Estate. The sole remaining housing block of Tung Tau (I) Estate was subsequently demolished. Tung Tau (II) Estate has 20 blocks built during the redevelopment in the 1980s and the 1990s.

Background
In the 1960s, Tung Tau Estate was built as a resettlement estate which had a total of 23 blocks (21 Mark II and two Mark IV blocks). Mark II blocks were rudimentary structures built to fulfil emergency housing needs, while the other two blocks were of the Old Slab typology. The 21 Mark II blocks of Tung Tau Estate housed approximately 49,200 people in 7,750 households, as well as around 586 shops.

All 21 Mark II blocks were demolished to make way for 20 new blocks in the 1980s and the 1990s. In 2002, some of the flats on the estate (except Block 22) were sold to tenants through the Tenants Purchase Scheme Phase 5. 

The two remaining resettlement-era blocks, numbered 22 and 23, were redeveloped later. Block 23 was demolished in 2003. That site was redeveloped as a separate housing estate, Tung Wui Estate, composed of two housing blocks and a community centre. The new estate began accepting residents in 2012. 

Block 22, built in 1965 and housing 906 domestic flats, was subject to structural investigations by the Housing Department in 2007. The block required costly repairs, and it was decided to redevelop the site instead. Block 22 was the sole remaining block of Tung Tau (I) Estate. Po Yan Oblate Primary School, which was connected to Block 22 but in good structural condition, was retained. The site of Block 22, like that of Block 23, has been incorporated into the new Tung Wui Estate, and a new housing block (Wui Chi House) has been built there.

Houses

Demographics
According to the 2016 by-census, the estate had a population of 15,562. The median age was 51.4. Over 97 per cent of residents were of Chinese ethnicity. The dominant spoken language was Cantonese.

Politics
Locally, the estate is represented on Wong Tai Sin District Council. It falls within two constituencies:

 Tung Tau constituency comprises the southern part of the estate, Tung Wui Estate, and some other neighbouring buildings. Since the 2019 election, it has been represented by Hiroko Wan Chi-chung of People Power.
 Tung Mei constituency principally comprises the northern part of Tung Tau Estate and nearby Mei Tung Estate. Since 2015, it has been represented by Sze Tak-loy of the ADPL.

In the Legislative Council, Tung Tau Estate falls within the Kowloon East geographic constituency, which elects five members to the council.

References

External links
 

Residential buildings completed in 1967
Residential buildings completed in 1981
Residential buildings completed in 1982
Residential buildings completed in 1985
Residential buildings completed in 1987
Residential buildings completed in 1988
Residential buildings completed in 1990
Residential buildings completed in 1991
Wong Tai Sin District
Nga Chin Wai
San Po Kong
Public housing estates in Hong Kong
Tenants Purchase Scheme
1967 establishments in Hong Kong